WDHS may refer to:
 WDHS, a television station in Iron Mountain, Michigan
 Wade Deacon High School, Widnes, Cheshire, England
 Waterdown District High School, Waterdown, Hamilton, Ontario, Canada
 Waterford District High School, Waterford, Ontario, Canada
 Western Dubuque High School, Epworth, Iowa, United States
 A defunct radio station in Gaston, Indiana